Ahmed Tawhid Mahmoud Bahij Zaher (born 13 December 1989 in Cairo), known as Ahmed Zaher,  is an Egyptian trap shooter. He competed in the trap event at the 2012 Summer Olympics and placed 22nd in the qualification round.

He competed at the 2020 Summer Olympics in the men's trap event.

References

External links
 

1989 births
Living people
Egyptian male sport shooters
Olympic shooters of Egypt
Shooters at the 2012 Summer Olympics
Competitors at the 2019 African Games
African Games competitors for Egypt
Shooters at the 2020 Summer Olympics
21st-century Egyptian people